Glipidiomorpha poggii is a species of beetle in the genus Glipidiomorpha of the family Mordellidae. It was described in 2001 by Franciscolo.

References

Beetles described in 2001
Mordellidae